Bone Palace Ballet is the second album by American post-hardcore band Chiodos, released on September 4, 2007. The album takes its name from a literary work of Charles Bukowski. It was their last album with vocalist Craig Owens and drummer Derrick Frost, until they both rejoined the band in 2012.

Following the album's release, it entered the U.S. Billboard 200 chart at number 5 and the Top Independent Albums at number 1, selling over 39,000 copies in its first week, making it one of the highest-charting post-hardcore albums to date. By January 2009, the album had sold more than 200,000 copies in the United States alone.

On September 4, 2007, Equal Vision Records released an opaque orange vinyl pressing of the album which included the full album on compact disc. It was limited to 2,000 copies.

Warner Bros. Records released Bone Palace Ballet: Grand Coda on January 26, 2009, as part of a new distribution deal in the UK.

Track listing

Additional information 
In the DVD section of this reissue, there is an appearance by the Trailer Park Boys at the Chiodos Madison Square Garden performance, and footage of them shown backstage with the band. There are also live clips of the band at various shows, with the songs "A Letter from Janelle" and "Lexington. (Joey Pea-Pot with a Monkey Face)" played over the performances.  The track "Teeth the Size of Piano Keys" was omitted from the reissue "just to mess with people," according to guitarist Pat McManaman.  However, it is unclear why the spoken words at the end of "The Undertakers Thirst for Revenge Is Unquenchable (The Final Battle)" are missing.  It may be due to possible copyright infringement of uncredited works.

The lyrics to "Teeth the Size of Piano Keys" are an adaptation of the Charles Bukowski poem "I'm in Love" and feature several direct quotations from the poem.

The spoken word segment at the end of "The Undertaker's Thirst for Revenge is Unquenchable" comes from the poem "Empty Is" by Rod McKuen.

Title origins
Bone Palace Ballet is the title of a book of poems by Charles Bukowski
"Is It Progression If a Cannibal Uses a Fork?" is a misquote of Stanisław Jerzy Lec ("Is it progress if a cannibal uses knife and fork?")
"Lexington. (Joey Pea-Pot with a Monkey Face)" is a combination of the name of Pat McManaman's first dog and Lexington, Kentucky, where the song was recorded.
"Bulls Make Money, Bears Make Money, Pigs Get Slaughtered" is phrase commonly said by Mad Money host Jim Cramer.  However, the phrase's origins go back much further to at least a century ago.
"A Letter From Janelle" is a letter that was sent to Craig Owens by a friend, Nicole Rork. The lyrics are of the pieces that Craig feels comfortable sharing, as the letter, which he reviews in times of distress, still means a great deal to him.
The title "I Didn't Say I Was Powerful, I Said I Was a Wizard" was said by Chiodos' guitar technician while he was high.
The title "Teeth the Size of Piano Keys" is taken from Slaughterhouse 5 by Kurt Vonnegut.
 The title "If I Cut My Hair, Hawaii Will Sink" was named when Matt Goddard drunkenly spoke the words to the other band members.
The title "Intensity in Ten Cities" is a quote from Mike Myers' character Wayne Campbell in the movie Wayne's World, alluding to the live album by Ted Nugent.
The song "The Undertaker's Thirst for Revenge is Unquenchable. (The Final Battle)" pays homage to how the band used to watch wrestling when they were young.  The opening line of the song is a quote from ‘’Harry Potter and the Goblet of Fire’’.
The title "Two Birds Stoned at Once" comes from an episode of Trailer Park Boys, where Ricky mistakenly says it rather than "two birds with one stone."

Usage in media
The first single "Lexington (Joey Pea-Pot with a Monkey Face)" was featured as a Rock Band Network track in the game Rock Band 2 and it was also re-released as a DLC track in Rock Band 4. 
The song "I Didn't Say I Was Powerful, I Said I Was a Wizard" was featured as a DLC track in the game Rock Band 2 and it can also be played in some of the other Rock Band games.
The song "Is It Progression if a Cannibal Uses a Fork?" was featured in the 2007's The Sims 2: Teen Style stuff pack.

Personnel
Chiodos
 Craig Owens - lead vocals
 Bradley Bell - keyboards, piano, vocals
 Jason Hale - lead guitar
 Pat McManaman - rhythm guitar
 Matt Goddard - bass guitar
 Derrick Frost - drums, percussion

Production
Produced by Casey Bates
Engineered by Casey Bates, Tim Price, Bryan Beeler, Dan Korneff and David Bendeth
Mixed by David Bendeth
Mastered by Casey Bates and Ue Nastasi, at Sterling Sound, New York City
Art direction and layout design by Paul A. Romano (workhardened.com)

Additional musicians
Additional vocals by Nicholas Anthony Martin (3, 10) and Jesse Korman (1, 3)
Violin by Victoria Parker
Cello, Trumpet and trombone and orchestral arrangements by Phillip A. Peterson
French horn by Jacob Hoffman

Charts

References

Chiodos albums
2007 albums
Equal Vision Records albums